Eyal Zlatin (born 9 March 1987 in Ein Harod, Israel) is an Israeli dressage rider.

Eyal Zlatin competed at the 2019 FEI European Championships representing Israel, finished 43rd. In 2018 he was qualified as individual for the 2018 World Equestrian Games, but did not compete. Zlatin was part of the Israeli team that finished fourth during the Nations Cup in Wellington, Florida. He is based in Germany where he runs his own equestrian business. His trainers include Klaus Balkenhol and Ferdi Eilberg.

References

Living people
1987 births
Israeli male equestrians
Israeli dressage riders
Israeli equestrians